Nezihe Bilgütay Derler (born 1926 on Heybeli Ada) is a Turkish miniaturist, known for her Çini, a traditional Turkish artform made on a layer of fusion between glass and porcelain. Her Çini patterns are widely used.

Derler learned the artform at the Academy of Fine Arts, from its first teachers of the republican era, Feyzullah Dayigil (1910–1949) and Muhsin Demironat (1920–1983), who themselves were pivotal in the 20th century rediscovery of the forgotten logic in the patterns of the traditional Çini artform. Derler passed on this knowledge to the next generation of artists, through her lessons and produced exemplars of Çini art.

She taught the art of Çini as an educator at the Mimar Sinan Fine Arts University. She played an important part in the development of the Çini artform in Turkey from where it was to the state that it is in today. She taught the next generation of Çini artists such as Mehmet Gürsoy. She continues to teach outside the university after her retirement.

Personal life 
Nezihe Bilgütay Derler was born in 1926 on Heybeliada, of the Princes' Islands as one of a few siblings. Her father, who was a sailor, died when she was just 6 months old. When she was 10 years old, her mother died, leaving her without any parents. She and her siblings were subsequently raised by their maternal aunt. Money was tight during her youth, she had to work while attending Istanbul Girls High School to make ends meet. After graduating from high school she was directed to the Istanbul Fine Arts Academy by a teacher who saw potential in her.

At the academy she was a student in the Department of Turkish Ornamentation. She majored in miniature taught by the Tabriz born Hussein Tahirzade Behzad (1887–1962) who taught at the academy from 1947 till his death in 1963. She also minored in tezhip (Ottoman illumination) which was taught by Muhsin Demironat (1907–1983). She was classmates with Neşe Aybey (1930–2015). She graduated from the academy in 1957.

Career 

From 1952 to 1960 she Derler worked on map paintings.

In 1960 she worked in a İznik style underglazed decor atelier with Muhsin Demironat, and ceramic artists Melike Abasıyanık (1930–2021), Şükran Ölcen and Nasip İyem (1921–2011).

Until 1966 she worked on Çini application, ceramic moulds and reliefs in Eczacıbaşı Arts Ateliers' factory in Kartal, Istanbul. She received offers from Yıldız Porcelain to come work there but relented and stayed at Eczacıbaşı until they rebuffed their offer and accepted to let her to work on whatever and whichever way she wants which finally convinced her to leave Eczacıbaşı for Yıldız Porcelain.

From 1966 to 1975 she was the chief of the workshop at the Sumerbank Yıldız Porcelain Industries hand crafts atelier. The graphical designs of the products produced by :tr:Yıldız Porselen Fabrikası Yıldız Porcelain were all designed by Derler between those years.

In 1967, together with Muhsin Demironat she made a panel with miniatures which won the silver medal at the International Ceramics Exhibition and Competition which was later bought by the now defunct Senate of the Republic of Turkey.

Starting part time in 1976 Derler eventually became a full time teacher at the Çini main art branch in Department of Traditional Turkish Arts at the Istanbul Academy of Fine Arts where she was a teacher until 1997

In 2005 Derler moved to Bodrum. After the death of her partner Haşım Derler she moved to İzmir.

Much of Derlers work is on display at her home in İzmir and the rest is in private collections across the world. The most of her work in a single place is likely in the collection of businessman Necip Tatari who was enthousiastic about art, he made a building specially for housing the works that Derler made from him, mostly panels. 

Although a trained miniaturist she is most regarded for her Çini however her training as a miniaturist does come to light in her Çini designs.

Exhibitions 
 Mehmet Akif Ersoy Sanat Merkezi, 13-31 October 2018

References

Sources 

1926 births
Turkish women artists
Academy of Fine Arts in Istanbul alumni
20th-century Turkish artists
21st-century Turkish artists
Turkish women academics
Turkish miniaturists